Lago Junior Wakalible (born 31 December 1990), known as Junior, is an Ivorian professional footballer who plays for Segunda División club Málaga CF as a winger.

Club career

Numancia
Born in Abidjan, Junior began his football career at the Centre de Formation Joël Tiéhi, a school founded by former player Joël Tiéhi. He made his senior debut with Issia Wazy in 2007, scoring at an excellent rate.

On 31 January 2009, Junior moved to Spain and signed a five-and-a-half-year contract with CD Numancia. He made his La Liga debut on 18 April, playing ten minutes in a 3–0 away loss against Atlético Madrid. He only appeared in four more matches until the end of the season, all as a substitute, and the Soria team were relegated as 19th.

Junior joined SD Eibar on 27 August 2010, in a season-long loan. Two days later, he scored twice on his official debut for the Segunda División B club, a 2–1 home win over CF Palencia.

Gimnàstic and Mirandés
On 13 July 2013, after a further two Segunda División campaigns with Numancia, Junior remained in the country and signed for Gimnàstic de Tarragona from division three. On 22 July 2015, after achieving promotion, he moved to CD Mirandés of the second tier.

Mallorca
On 28 January 2016, Junior agreed to a €300,000 deal at second-division RCD Mallorca. After suffering relegation at the end of the 2016–17 campaign he went on to help the side to earn two consecutive promotions, netting a career-best 11 goals in 2018–19.

Junior subsequently lost his importance in the squad. In December 2021, he was loaned to SD Huesca. 

On 11 January 2023, Junior terminated his contract by mutual consent.

Later career
Immediately after leaving Mallorca, Junior joined second-tier Málaga CF on a free transfer, signing until June 2024 with an option for another year.

International career
Junior won his first cap for the Ivory Coast national team on 13 October 2020 at the age of nearly 30, replacing Gervinho late into the 1–0 friendly defeat to Japan in Utrecht, Netherlands.

Career statistics

Club

International

References

External links

1990 births
Living people
Footballers from Abidjan
Ivorian footballers
Association football wingers
La Liga players
Segunda División players
Segunda División B players
CD Numancia players
SD Eibar footballers
Gimnàstic de Tarragona footballers
CD Mirandés footballers
RCD Mallorca players
SD Huesca footballers
Málaga CF players
Ivory Coast international footballers
2011 CAF U-23 Championship players
Ivorian expatriate footballers
Expatriate footballers in Spain
Ivorian expatriate sportspeople in Spain